CYT may refer to:

 Christian Youth Theater
 Yakataga Airport, IATA code
 Cyt proteins, a type of Bacillus thuringiensis Delta endotoxin